Siemens A50 is a mobile phone manufactured by Siemens Mobile. It was one of the best sold mobile phones from 2002. The phone was announced in October 2002.

The phone included a WAP browser and two games: Stack Attack and Balloon Shooter.

External links 

 https://mobilenet.cz/ Czech article about the Siemens A50
https://www.techtudo.com.br/ article from TechTudo

References 

Siemens mobile phones